The Bahama swallow (Tachycineta cyaneoviridis) is a swallow found only in the Bahamas.

Description
This glossy Tachycineta swallow has a green head and back, blue upper wings, a black tail and wingtips, and a white belly and chin.

Range and habitat
This swallow breeds only in pineyards on four islands in the northern Bahamas: Andros, Grand Bahama, Abaco, and New Providence. The breeding population on New Providence is, at the very least, greatly reduced from historical levels, and may be extirpated as a breeding species.

The Bahama swallow winters throughout the eastern Bahamas and the Turks and Caicos Islands. It is a rare vagrant elsewhere during migration, including south Florida and the Florida Keys.  It is also an occasional vagrant to the southerly Americas.

T. cyaneoviridis is a bird of the Caribbean pine forests. They are somewhat capable of adapting to urban habitat. Although they do not breed in marshland and fields, they need such habitat to forage; like all swallows they feed on flying insects.

Reproduction
Bahama swallows nest in old West Indian woodpecker holes in Caribbean pine (Pinus caribaea var. bahamensis), using pine needles, twigs of trees from the genus Casuarina (introduced species in the Bahamas), and grass to make the nest, and they line it with feathers from other passerines. They typically lay three eggs. Incubation is 15 days and the fledging period is roughly 22 days.

References

Bahama swallow
Birds of the Bahamas
Birds of the Turks and Caicos Islands
Bahama swallow
Endemic birds of the Bahamas
Bahama swallow